Ledina is a dispersed settlement in the hills northwest of Sevnica in east-central Slovenia.

It is also a given name. It may refer to:

Ledina Aliolli, Albanian politician and member of the Assembly of the Republic of Albania
Ledina Çelo (born 1977), Albanian singer and model
Ledina Mandia, Albanian politician, Albanian Deputy Prime Minister